J. Roger Guffey (September 11, 1929 – April 15, 2009) was president of the Federal Reserve Bank of Kansas City from 1976 to 1991.

Among Guffey's contributions was starting the Bank's Jackson Hole, Wyoming, Symposium which began as an agricultural symposium in 1978 but had become broader when it moved to Jackson Hole in 1982.

Guffey was born in Kingston, Missouri.  He received a degree in business administration from the University of Missouri, worked in the intelligence services in Germany during World War II and then graduated from the University of Missouri School of Law.

He was a partner at the Kansas City firm Fallon, Guffey and Jenkins becoming general counsel for the Kansas City Federal Reserve in 1968 and became president of the bank on March 1, 1976.

A theatre at the bank's 1 Memorial Drive building is named for him.

References

1929 births
2009 deaths
Businesspeople from Missouri
Federal Reserve Bank of Kansas City presidents
People from Caldwell County, Missouri
University of Missouri School of Law alumni
20th-century American businesspeople